Super Batter Up, known in Japan as  is a baseball video game with both a one- and two-player mode plus a league mode.

The North American release has an official license from the Major League Baseball Players Association and features the names of actual professional baseball players. However, it does not have a license from Major League Baseball, so no actual team names are used; the teams are only identified by their respective locales. While the all-star mode in the Japanese version of the game closely mimics the Nippon Professional Baseball All-Star Series, the North American version of the game emulates the MLB All-Star Game. An intrasquad mode (found only in the Japanese version) allows players on the same team to face off against each other. The only limitations are that there are only five pitchers on each team, players cannot be changed, and uniforms are limited to red and white colors.

Gameplay

The game features teams representing the 26 Major League Baseball teams and their players from the 1991 Major League Baseball season. Ballplayers who competed during that baseball season like Cal Ripken, Dave Winfield, and Kirby Puckett are included. However, the Japanese version was released featuring teams and actual player names from the Nippon Professional Baseball league. Players get to play in either a dome resembling the Tokyo Dome in Japan or Rogers Centre (then called SkyDome) in Toronto, a contemporary baseball stadium (with homages to Japan's Koshien Stadium or Chicago's Wrigley Field), or in traditional-style stadium style (reminiscent of Chiba Marine Stadium in Japan or Busch Memorial Stadium in St. Louis). Each player in the Japanese version of the game has a popularity meter that gauges how liked they are by the audience; better players are more likely to be cheered on for an excellent play.

Players are shown standing up for the national anthem of both the United States and Canada (when the home team is Toronto or Montreal). They can also choose to substitute a hitter or a runner while at bat. All game stats are shown on the fictitious newspaper, known as the Namco Sports paper. Players are permitted to zoom in and out of the paper to look for minor details. The words "game over" appear on the screen regardless of whether the player wins or loses a game. Passwords can be entered to restore progress in the game. Both one-player and two-player modes integrates the traditional playing mode of the game. If the player wins the single-player tournament, then he can see the ending. The battle mode becomes a single-game mode when two players are playing. While the Japanese version of this game uses super deformed graphics for the ballplayers, the North American version uses 2D rendering software to create more realistic graphics.

The single-player league play mode keep tracks of all the players statistics during the season. Pitchers are considered to be "cold" when their ERA is above 9.90.

Stadium dimensions

Reception

In Japan, it topped the Famitsu sales charts from April 1992 to May 1992.

Allgame editor Brett Alan Weiss described Super Batter Up as "an average baseball game", although he praised the game's "solid controls".

See also
Family Stadium

Notes

References

Bibliography

1992 video games
Family Stadium and spin-offs
Major League Baseball video games
Namco games
Super Nintendo Entertainment System games
Super Nintendo Entertainment System-only games
Video games developed in Japan
Video games set in 1991
Multiplayer and single-player video games